The women's football tournament at the 2015 Pan American Games in Toronto, Canada was held at the Hamilton Pan Am Soccer Stadium in Hamilton from July 11 to 25.

For the football competition in these Games, the women competed in an eight-team tournament. The teams were grouped into two pools of four teams each for a round-robin preliminary round. The top two teams in each group advanced to a single elimination bracket. The women’s competition was an open-age competition with no age restrictions.

Canada were the defending champions from the 2011 Pan American Games in Guadalajara. The gold medal was won by Brazil.

Qualification
A total of eight women's teams qualified to compete at the games. Hosts Canada and Mexico qualified automatically. The winners of the regional Caribbean and Central American championships also qualified. The top four teams at the South American Championships also qualified.

Summary

Qualified teams
The following eight teams qualified for the final tournament.

Medalists

Rosters

At the start of tournament, all eight participating countries had to submit up to 18 players on their rosters.

Competition format

In the first round of the competition, teams were divided into two groups of four teams, played in round-robin format with each of the teams playing all other teams in the group once. Teams were awarded three points for a win, one point for a draw and zero points for a loss. The teams were ranked as follows:
Points
Goal difference
Goals scored
Head-to-head points
Drawing of lots

Following the completion of the group games, the top two teams in each group advanced to the semifinals, with the winners of one group playing the runners-up of another group. The winners of the semifinals advanced to the gold medal match and the losers advanced to the bronze medal match.

All games were played in two 45-minute halves. In the medal round, if the match ended in a draw after 90 minutes, extra time was played (two 15-minute halves), followed by penalty kicks competition if the match still remained tied.

First round
The official detailed schedule and draw was revealed on April 24, 2015.

All times were Eastern Daylight Time (UTC−4)

Group A

Group B

Medal round

Semifinals

Bronze medal match

Gold medal match

Competition summary

Goalscorers
7 goals
 Cristiane

3 goals
 Stephany Mayor

2 goals

 Andressa Alves
 Formiga
 Maurine
 Rafaelle
 Janine Beckie
 Shelina Zadorsky
 Catalina Usme
 Ligia Moreira
 Kerlly Real
 Mónica Ocampo
 Nayeli Rangel
 Mariah Shade

1 goal

 Florencia Bonsegundo
 Mariana Larroquette
 María Belén Potassa
 Fabiana
 Monica
 Raquel
 Thaisa
 Jessie Fleming
 Emma Fletcher
 Nataly Arias
 Diana Ospina
 Ingrid Vidal
 Shirley Cruz
 Karla Villalobos
 Denise Pesántes
 Teresa Noyola
 Jennifer Ruiz
 Maylee Atthin-Johnson
 Kennya Cordner

1 own goal

 Fabiana (playing against Mexico)
 Arianna Romero (playing against Brazil)

Final standings

References

External links
Football - Event Overview - Women, Toronto 2015 Official Website

women
2015 in women's association football
2015 in Brazilian women's football
2015 in Colombian football
2015 in Canadian women's soccer
2015 in Ecuadorian football
2015–16 in Mexican football
2015 in Argentine football
2015–16 in Costa Rican football
2015–16 in Trinidad and Tobago football
2016